
Year 66 BC was a year of the pre-Julian Roman calendar. At the time it was known as the Year of the Consulship of Lepidus and Tullus (or, less frequently, year 688 Ab urbe condita). The denomination 66 BC for this year has been used since the early medieval period, when the Anno Domini calendar era became the prevalent method in Europe for naming years.

Events 
 By place 

 Roman Republic 
 Consuls: Manius Aemilius Lepidus and Lucius Volcatius Tullus.
 Catiline accused of conspiring against the Roman Republic with Autronius and the younger Sulla (also in 63 BC during the consulship of Cicero).
 The alliance between Mithridates VI of Pontus and Tigranes II of Armenia is broken.
 Tigranes II is forced to surrender, by a payment of 6,000 talents, and is reinstated by Pompey as a "friend of the Roman people" to hold Armenia as a buffer zone.
 Battle of the Lycus: Pompey the Great decisively defeats Mithridates VI, effectively ending the Third Mithridatic War.
 Gaius Antonius elected Roman praetor.
 The lex Manilia, supported by Cicero gives Pompey command over all of Asia.
 Cicero becomes praetor in Rome.

 Judea 
 Aristobulus II becomes king and high priest of Judea, until 63 BC.

Births 
 Octavia (the Younger), grandniece of Julius Caesar (d. 11 BC)

Deaths 
 Licinius Macer, Roman annalist

Citations

References